Helcystogramma angustum is a moth in the family Gelechiidae. It was described by Hou-Hun Li and Hui Zhen in 2011. It is found in the Chinese provinces of Guizhou and Hubei.

The wingspan is 11.5–15 mm. The forewings are yellowish brown to greyish brown, with scattered dark brown scales. The basal two-thirds of the costal margin is dark brown and the distal third is yellow. The hindwings are grey.

Etymology
The species name refers to the relatively slender uncus and is derived from Latin angustus (meaning slender).

References

Moths described in 2011
angustum
Moths of Asia